Cattle baron is a historic term for a local businessman and landowner who possessed great power or influence through the operation of a large ranch with many beef cattle.  Cattle barons in the late 19th century United States were also sometimes referred to as cowmen, stockmen, or just ranchers. In Australia, similar individuals owned large cattle stations.  A similar phenomenon occurred in part of Canada in the early twentieth century.

Notable examples
In the American Old West:
Otto Franc 
Charles Goodnight.  Essayist and historian J. Frank Dobie said that Goodnight "approached greatness more nearly than any other cowman of history."
John Chisum
Tom McCall
Conrad Kohrs;  see Grant-Kohrs Ranch National Historic Site
Oliver Loving
James Dolan
Susan McSween
Frank Wolcott
Margaret Borland

In Australia:
Peter Menegazzo
Sidney Kidman

In Canada:
The Big Four (Calgary) (four businessmen: two ranchers, a meat packer, and a brewer who founded the Calgary Stampede, the world's richest rodeo)
George Lane, rancher
A. E. Cross, rancher Bar U Ranch
Patrick Burns
Archibald J. McLean

In England:
Jonathan Wall (Cambridge) (Baron of Cambridge who held a significant amount of land on which he kept several thousand cattle)

In popular culture
Cattle barons appear in numerous Western novels and films, often as villains. Such films include Broken Lance (1954), Lawman (1971) and Heaven's Gate (1980). In the Fallout video game series, Brahmin barons are exactly the same as cattle barons but herd mutated livestock instead of normal animals.

See also
Cattle Baron's Ball, a Dallas, Texas fundraising event
Wyoming Stock Growers Association
Aztec Land & Cattle Company (1884–1902)
Willamette Cattle Company
Santa Fe Ring
Empire Ranch

References

Animal husbandry occupations
American frontier
American cattlemen
American ranchers
Western (genre) staples and terminology